Monica may refer to:

People
Monica (actress) (born 1987), Indian film actress 
Monica (given name), a given name (including a list of people and characters with the name)
Monica (singer) (born 1980), American  R&B singer, songwriter, producer, and actress
Saint Monica, mother of Augustine

Places

 833 Monica, a minor planet
 Monica, Kentucky
 Santa Monica, California

Arts, entertainment, and media

Fiction
Monica (2011 film), an Indian film
Monica (2022 film), an American-Italian film
Monica, a fictional country in Æon Flux
Monica, a fictional planet in David Weber's science fiction Honorverse

Music
 MONICA, a Scottish band featuring members of Win/The Apples and Trembling Bells
"Monica" (song), a song by The Kinks from their album The Kinks Are the Village Green Preservation Society (1968)
"Monica", a song by Dan Bern from his album Fifty Eggs
"Monica", a 1984 song by Kōji Kikkawa
Leslie Cheung, covered into Cantonese in 1984
 Leo Ku, another Cantonese cover song

Vehicles and transportation
Monica (automobile)
Monica (radar)
Monica (rocket)
, a Finnish coaster ship in service 1955–57

Other uses
Monica (grape)
Tropical Storm Monica (disambiguation), various
Cyclone Monica, a tropical cyclone

See also

Monika (disambiguation)
Moniker
Monique (disambiguation)
Santa Monica (disambiguation)
Santa Monica, California, USA